Imara is a genus of moths within the family Castniidae.

Species
Imara analibiae Espinoza & González, 2005
Imara pallasia (Eschscholtz, 1821) 
Imara satrapes (Kollar, 1839)

References

Castniidae